Navlya is an urban-type settlement in Bryansk Oblast, Russia. It is the administrative center of Navlinsky District. Population:

History
The town was founded in 1904 in connection with the construction of the Moscow-Kiev-Voronezh railway. Since 1938 the settlement is mostly urban.

During the German occupation in World War II, from November 1941 to September 1943, it was part of Navlya Lokotskogo District. Guerrilla groups were active in the woods near Navlya, While an underground Komsomol group operated in the town.

Economy
In the settlement there are several industries including a repair plant, Auto Aggregate Plant (manufacture of driveshafts), Factory "Promsvyaz" (manufacture of machinery for the construction of cable lines), Food Factory, conducted asphalt production and harvesting.

Place of interest
In Navlya there is the Museum of Partisan Glory, underground guerrillas monument "Memory Wall" with a bust of the commander of one of the groups, Peter Derevyanko, as well as a monument to the soldiers of the 10th separate tank brigade of the Bryansk Front based around an IS-2 tank mounted on a pedestal. In addition, in the town is a monument to Lenin, the stele in honor of the liberation of the city, a monument and burial of defenders and civilians Navlya on the forecourt. Knyazev is a monument to the defenders of the city, in the park. Derevianko - a monument to the liquidators of the Chernobyl accident.

References

Urban-type settlements in Bryansk Oblast